The February 2010 Lower Dir bombing was a suicide bombing in the Lower Dir District area of Pakistan on 3 February 2010. At least 8 people, including three American soldiers, died. Three schoolgirls were among the dead.  Another 70 people, including 63 schoolgirls, were among the injured.

Attack
The soldiers were travelling in a convoy and headed for the inauguration of a girls' school. They were part of a contingent of approximately 70 soldiers training Pakistani soldiers in counter insurgency.   The bomb went off near another girls school in the village of Koto along the way.  The Koto Girls High School was flattened, leaving the girls crying under the rubble.  The American soldiers were helping train Pakistan Frontier Corps.

Aftermath
Tehrik-i-Taliban Pakistan claimed responsibility for the bombing.  They claimed that the attack was in retaliation of October 2008 attack by Blackwater Worldwide in Peshawar.  Pakistan arrested 35 people in connection with this bombing.  However a backlash against U.S. troop presence in Pakistan did not happen against some analysts predictions.

See also
List of terrorist incidents, 2010
Terrorist incidents in Pakistan in 2010

References

External links
In pictures: Pakistan convoy attack

2010 murders in Pakistan
Islamic terrorist incidents in 2010
Mass murder in 2010
School bombings
Suicide bombings in Pakistan
Terrorist incidents in Pakistan in 2010
Crime in Khyber Pakhtunkhwa
February 2010 events in Pakistan